Hydrops martii, the Amazon water snake, is a snake of the colubrid family. It is found in Peru, Colombia, Brazil, Ecuador, and Venezuela.

References

Hydrops
Snakes of South America
Reptiles of Peru
Reptiles of Brazil
Reptiles of Colombia
Reptiles of Ecuador
Reptiles of Venezuela
Reptiles described in 1824
Taxa named by Johann Georg Wagler